Jessy Mayele (born 11 February 1991 in Kinshasa) is a Dutch professional footballer who plays as a winger. He has previously played for Fortuna Sittard, Sparta Rotterdam, FC Dordrecht, USM Bel Abbès and Ermis Aradippou.

External links
 Voetbal International profile 

1991 births
Living people
Dutch footballers
Fortuna Sittard players
Sparta Rotterdam players
FC Dordrecht players
Ermis Aradippou FC players
Eerste Divisie players
Cypriot First Division players
Footballers from Kinshasa
Expatriate footballers in Algeria
Algerian Ligue Professionnelle 1 players
USM Bel Abbès players
Dutch expatriate footballers
Expatriate footballers in Cyprus
Dutch people of Democratic Republic of the Congo descent
Association football midfielders